Delias is a genus of butterflies. There are about 250 species of the genus Delias, found in South Asia and Australia. The genus is considered to have its evolutionary origins in the Australian region.

Species

The singhapura species group
Delias agoranis Grose-Smith, 1887
Delias kuehni Honrath, 1887 (or Delias kuhni)
Delias singhapura (Wallace, 1867)
Delias themis (Hewitson, 1861)
The nysa species group
Delias battana Fruhstorfer, 1896 Sulawesi
Delias blanca (Felder, C & R Felder, 1862) Philippines and Borneo
Delias dice (van Vollenhoven, 1865)
Delias dumasi Rothschild, 1925 Buru
Delias enniana Oberthür, 1880
Delias fruhstorferi (Honrath, 1891)
Delias ganymedes Okumoto, 1981
Delias georgina (Felder, C & R Felder, 1861)
Delias hempeli Dannatt, 1904 Halmaheira
Delias lemoulti Talbot, 1931 Timor
Delias manuselensis Talbot, 1920 Serang, Ambon
Delias maudei Joicey & Noakes, 1915 Biak
Delias momea (Boisduval, 1836) Sumatra, Java
Delias nuydaorum Schröder, H, 1975
Delias nysa (Fabricius, 1775)
Delias pulla Talbot, 1937 New Guinea
Delias ribbei Röber, 1886 Aru
Delias schoenigi Schröder, H, 1975
Delias schuppi Talbot, 1928 Serang
Delias vietnamensis Monastyrskii & Devyatkin, 2000 Vietnam, Cambodia
Delias waterstradti Rothschild, 1915 Halmaheira
The chrysomelaena species group
Delias caliban Grose-Smith, 1897
Delias chrysomelaena (van Vollenhoven, 1866) Halmahera, Bachan
Delias ladas Grose-Smith, 1894
Delias talboti Joicey & Noakes, 1915 Biak
Delias totila Heller, 1896 New Britain
The stresemanni species group
Delias lecerfi Joicey & Talbot, 1922 New Guinea
Delias schmassmanni Joicey & Talbot, 1923 Buru
Delias stresemanni Rothschild, 1915 Serang
The geraldina species group
Delias abrophora Roepke, 1955 New Guinea
Delias anjae Schroder, 1977
Delias argentata Roepke, 1955 New Guinea
Delias aroae (Ribbe, 1900)
Delias cuningputi (Ribbe, 1900) New Guinea
Delias jordani Kenrick, 1909
Delias daniensis van Mastrigt, 2003 New Guinea
Delias destrigata van Mastrigt, 1996 New Guinea
Delias dortheysi van Mastrigt, 2002 New Guinea
Delias eudiabolus Rothschild, 1915 New Guinea
Delias fascelis Jordan, 1912 New Guinea
Delias geraldina Grose-Smith, 1894
Delias heroni Kenrick, 1909
Delias hikarui Yagishita, 1993 New Guinea
Delias hypomelas Rothschild & Jordan, 1907
Delias imitator Kenrick, 1911 New Guinea
Delias inopinata Lachlan, 2000 New Guinea
Delias itamputi Ribbe, 1900
Delias langda Gerrits & van Mastrigt, 1992 New Guinea
Delias microsticha Rothschild, 1904
Delias nigropunctata Joicey & Noakes, 1915 New Guinea
Delias oktanglap van Mastrigt, 1990 New Guinea
Delias pheres Jordan, 1912 New Guinea
Delias kenricki Talbot, 1937
Delias rileyi Joicey & Talbot, 1922 New Guinea
Delias sagessa Fruhstorfer, 1910
Delias sinak Mastrigt, 1990 New Guinea
Delias sphenodiscus Roepke, 1955 New Guinea
Delias subapicalis Orr & Sibatani, 1985 New Guinea
Delias takashii Sakuma, 1999 New Guinea
Delias thompsoni Joicey & Talbot, 1916 New Guinea
The eichhorni species group
Delias antara Roepke, 1955 New Guinea
Delias carstensziana Rothschild, 1915 New Guinea
Delias catisa Jordan, 1912 New Guinea
Delias eichhorni Rothschild, 1904
Delias frater Jordan, 1912 New Guinea
Delias germana Roepke, 1955
Delias gilliardi Sanford & Bennett, 1955 New Guinea
Delias hallstromi Sanford & Bennett, 1955
Delias leucobalia Jordan, 1912 New Guinea
Delias muliensis Morinaka, van Mastrigt & Sibatani, 1991 New Guinea
Delias mullerensis Morinaka & Nakazawa, 1999
Delias toxopei Roepke, 1955 New Guinea
The bornemanni species group
Delias bornemanni Ribbe, 1900 New Guinea
Delias caroli Kenrick, 1909
Delias castaneus Kenrick, 1909
Delias nais Jordan, 1912
Delias pratti Kenrick, 1909
Delias maaikeae Davenport, Pequin, De Vries, 2017 New Guinea
The iltis species group
Delias arabuana Roepke, 1955 New Guinea
Delias awongkor van Mastrigt, 1989 New Guinea
Delias bakeri Kenrick, 1909
Delias callista Jordan, 1912 New Guinea
Delias flavistriga Roepke, 1955 New Guinea
Delias iltis Ribbe, 1900
Delias luctuosa Jordan, 1912 New Guinea
Delias mesoblema Jordan, 1912
Delias raymondi Schröder & Treadaway, 1982 New Guinea
The weiskei species group
Delias callima Rothschild & Jordan, 1905 New Guinea
Delias campbelli Joicey & Talbot, 1922 New Guinea
Delias hapalina Jordan, 1912 New Guinea
Delias leucias Jordan, 1912 New Guinea
Delias marguerita Joicey & Talbot, 1922 New Guinea
Delias nieuwenhuisi van Mastrigt, 1990 New Guinea
Delias phippsi Joicey & Talbot, 1922 New Guinea
Delias pseudomarguerita Gerrits & van Mastrigt, 1992 New Guinea
Delias rosamontana Roepke, 1955 New Guinea
Delias tessei Joicey & Talbot, 1916 New Guinea
Delias virgo Gerrits & van Mastrigt, 1992 New Guinea
Delias weiskei Ribbe, 1900
The kummeri species group
Delias alepa Jordan, 1912 New Guinea
Delias bothwelli Kenrick, 1909
Delias dixeyi Kenrick, 1909
Delias isocharis Rothschild & Jordan, 1907
Delias kummeri Ribbe, 1900
Delias ligata Rothschild, 1904
Delias strix Yagishita, 1993 New Guinea
The nigrina species group
Delias buruana Rothschild, 1899 Buru, Serang
Delias dohertyi (Oberthür, 1894)
Delias duris (Hewitson, 1861)
Delias eximia Rothschild, 1925 New Ireland
Delias funerea Rothschild, 1894
Delias joiceyi Talbot, 1920 Serang
Delias nigrina (Fabricius, 1775)
Delias ornytion (Godman & Salvin, 1881) New Guinea, Waigeu
Delias prouti Joicey & Talbot, 1923 Buru
Delias wollastoni Rothschild, 1915 New Guinea
The belladonna species group
Delias belladonna (Fabricius, 1793)
Delias benasu Martin, L, 1913 Sulawesi
Delias berinda (Moore, 1872)
Delias lativitta Leech, 1893
Delias patrua Leech, 1890 Tibet, China, Burma
Delias sanaca (Moore, 1857)
Delias subnubila Leech, 1893 China
Delias wilemani Jordan, 1925
The aglaia/pasithoe species group
Delias acalis (Godart, 1819)
Delias crithoe (Guérin-Méneville & Percheron, 1835) Java, Sumatra, Sumbawa, Sumba
Delias pasithoe (Linnaeus, 1767)
Delias henningia (Eschscholtz, 1821)
Delias ninus (Wallace, 1867)
Delias woodi Talbot, 1928
The albertisi species group
Delias albertisi (Oberthür, 1880)
Delias discus Honrath, 1886 New Guinea
Delias putih van Mastrigt, 1995
Delias telefominensis Yagishita, 1993 New Guinea
The clathrata species group
Delias autumnalis Roepke, 1955 New Guinea
Delias bobaga van Mastrigt, 1996 New Guinea
Delias catocausta Jordan, 1912 New Guinea
Delias clathrata Rothschild, 1904
Delias elongatus Kenrick, 1911 New Guinea
Delias fioretti van Mastrigt, 1996 New Guinea
Delias hiemalis Roepke, 1955 New Guinea
Delias hemianops Gerrits & van Mastrigt, 1992 New Guinea
Delias inexpectata Rothschild, 1915 New Guinea
Delias klossi Rothschild, 1915 New Guinea
Delias mariae Joicey & Talbot, 1916 New Guinea
Delias menooensis Joicey & Talbot, 1922 New Guinea
Delias mira Rothschild, 1904
Delias nakanokeikoae Yagishita, 1993 New Guinea
Delias neeltje Gerrits & van Mastrigt, 1992 New Guinea
Delias roepkei Sanford & Bennett, 1955 New Guinea
Delias sawyeri van Mastrigt, 2000 New Guinea
Delias sigit van Mastrigt, 1990 New Guinea
Delias walshae Roepke, 1955 New Guinea
The niepelti species group
Delias anamesa Bennett, 1956
Delias meeki Rothschild, 1904
Delias niepelti Ribbe, 1900
The belisama species group
Delias aganippe (Donovan, 1805)
Delias apoensis Talbot, 1928
Delias aruna (Boisduval, 1832)
Delias aurantia Doherty, 1891 Java
Delias belisama (Cramer, 1779)
Delias descombesi (Boisduval, 1836)
Delias diaphana Semper, G, 1878
Delias ellipsis de Joannis, 1901 New Caledonia
Delias eumolpe Grose-Smith, 1889
Delias harpalyce (Donovan, 1805)
Delias levicki Rothschild, 1927
Delias madetes (Godman & Salvin, 1878)
Delias oraia Doherty, 1891
Delias splendida Rothschild, 1894
Delias zebuda (Hewitson, 1862)
The dorimene species group
Delias agostina (Hewitson, 1852)
Delias alberti Rothschild, 1904
Delias apatela Joicey & Talbot, 1923 Buru
Delias baracasa Semper, G, 1890
Delias biaka Joicey & Noakes, 1915 Biak
Delias dorimene (Stoll, 1782)
Delias dorylaea (Felder, C & R Felder, 1865) Java
Delias echidna (Hewitson, 1861)
Delias eileenae Joicey & Talbot, 1927 Timor
Delias gabia (Boisduval, 1832)
Delias hippodamia (Wallace, 1867)
Delias mavroneria Fruhstorfer, 1914 New Guinea
Delias melusina Staudinger, 1890
Delias narses Heller, 1896 New Britain, New Ireland
Delias rothschildi Holland, W, 1900
Delias subviridis Joicey & Talbot, 1922 Serang
The isse species group
Delias bosnikiana Joicey & Noakes, 1915 Biak
Delias candida (van Vollenhoven, 1865)
Delias ennia (Wallace, 1867)
Delias isse (Cramer, 1775)
Delias lytaea (Godman & Salvin, 1878) New Britain, New Ireland, New Georgia Group
Delias periboea (Godart, 1819)
Delias sacha Grose-Smith, 1895
The hyparete species group
Delias argenthona (Fabricius, 1793)
Delias bagoe (Boisduval, 1832)
Delias ceneus (Linnaeus, 1758)
Delias edela Fruhstorfer, 1910
Delias eucharis (Drury, 1773)
Delias euphemia Grose-Smith, 1894
Delias fasciata Rothschild, 1894
Delias doylei Sanford & Bennett, 1955 New Guinea
Delias hyparete (Linnaeus, 1758)
Delias mitisi Staudinger, 1895 Sula, Banggai
Delias mysis (Fabricius, 1775)
Delias lara (Boisduval, 1836)
Delias periboea (Godart, 1819)
Delias poecilea (van Vollenhoven, 1865)
Delias rosenbergii (van Vollenhoven, 1865)
Delias salvini Butler, 1882
Delias sambawana Rothschild, 1894
Delias schoenbergi Rothschild, 1895
Delias timorensis (Boisduval, 1836)
Incertae sedis
Delias africanus Kenrick, 1911
Delias akikoae Morita, 2001 Aru
Delias akrikensis Lachlan, 1999 New Guinea
Delias angabungana Talbot, 1928 New Guinea
Delias binniensis Lachlan, 2000 New Guinea
Delias brandti Müller, C, 2001 New Ireland
Delias chimbu Orr & Sibatani, 1986 New Guinea
Delias cumanau van Mastrigt, 2006 New Guinea
Delias durai van Mastrigt, 2006
Delias endela Jordan, 1930 New Guinea
Delias eschatia Joicey & Talbot, 1923 Buru
Delias felis Lachlan, 2000 New Guinea
Delias flavissima Orr & Sibatani, 1985 New Guinea
Delias fojaensis van Mastrigt, 2006 New Guinea
Delias hagenensis Morinaka, van Mastrigt & Sibatani, 1993
Delias hidecoae Nakano, 1993
Delias kazueae Kitahara, 1986 Sula Islands
Delias kikuoi Okano, 1989 Sulawesi
Delias konokono Orr & Sibatani, 1986 New Guinea
Delias kristianiae van Mastrigt, 2006
Delias laknekei Miller, L, Simon & Wills, 2007 New Ireland
Delias magsadana Yamamoto, 1995 Philippines
Delias mandaya Yamamoto & Takei, 1982
Delias mayrhoferi Bang-Haas, O, 1939 New Britain
Delias messalina Arora, 1983 New Ireland
Delias mullerensis Morinaka & Nakazawa, 1999 New Guinea
Delias ormoensis van Mastrigt, 2006 New Guinea
Delias paoaiensis Inomata & Nakano, 1987
Delias shirozui Yata, 1981 Sulawesi
Delias shunichii Morita, 1996 New Britain
Delias vidua Joicey & Talbot, 1922 Buru
Delias yagishitai Morita, 2003 Taliabu Island

References

External links

Delias of the World
Images representing Delias at EOL
 Pteron In Japanese but binomial names 3 pages of images. Tip Next page.
 
 Flickr Images

 
Pierini
Pieridae genera
Taxa named by Jacob Hübner